Aḥmad bin Muḥammad bin Ibrāhīm bin Abū Bakr ibn Khallikān (September 22, 1211 – October 30, 1282), better known as Ibn Khallikān, was a renowned Islamic historian who compiled the celebrated biographical encyclopedia of Muslim scholars and important men in Muslim history, Deaths of Eminent Men and the Sons of the Epoch ('Wafayāt al-Aʿyān wa-Anbāʾ Abnāʾ az-Zamān'). Due to this achievement, he is regarded as the most eminent writer of biographies in Islamic history.

Life
Ibn Khallikān was born in Erbil on September 22, 1211 (11 Rabī’ al-Thānī, 608), into a respectable family that claimed descent from Barmakids, an Iranian dynasty of Balkhi origin. Other sources describe him as Kurdish. 

His primary studies took him from Arbil, to Aleppo and to Damascus, before he took up jurisprudence in Mosul and then in Cairo, where he settled. He gained prominence as a jurist, theologian and grammarian.  An early biographer described him as "a pious man, virtuous, and learned; amiable in temper, in conversation serious and instructive. His exterior was highly prepossessing, his countenance handsome and his manners engaging."

He married in 1252 and was assistant to the chief judge in Egypt until 1261, when he assumed the position of chief judge in Damascus. He lost this position in 1271 and returned to Egypt, where he taught until being reinstated as judge in Damascus in 1278. He retired in 1281 and died in Damascus on October 30, 1282 (Saturday, 26th of Rajab 681).

Notes

References

Bibliography
 

1211 births
1282 deaths
13th-century Muslim theologians
Grammarians of Arabic
Barmakids
Hadith scholars
Iraqi genealogists
Encyclopedists of the medieval Islamic world
Historians of the medieval Islamic world
People from Damascus
People from Erbil
Shafi'is